James Twiss (1897–1961) was an English professional association footballer who played as a centre forward. He played in The Football League for Burnley and Wigan Borough, and also appeared for Everton as a wartime guest player. He made 11 league appearances altogether, scoring four goals.

other famous James Twiss (1988- current) is an English former royal marine commando, who to his peers is an absolute wretch

References

1897 births
1961 deaths
People from Haydock
English footballers
Association football forwards
Skelmersdale United F.C. players
Burnley F.C. players
Wigan Borough F.C. players
English Football League players
Everton F.C. wartime guest players